Geoffrey W Baker is a male former rower who competed for England.

Rowing career
He represented England and won a gold medal in the doubles sculls with Mike Spracklen, at the 1958 British Empire and Commonwealth Games in Cardiff, Wales.

Baker and Spracklen rowed for Marlow Rowing Club.

References

English male rowers
Commonwealth Games medallists in rowing
Commonwealth Games gold medallists for England
Rowers at the 1958 British Empire and Commonwealth Games
Medallists at the 1958 British Empire and Commonwealth Games